SpaceX CRS-16, also known as SpX-16, was a Commercial Resupply Service mission to the International Space Station launched on 5 December 2018  aboard a Falcon 9 launch vehicle. The mission was contracted by NASA and is flown by SpaceX.

This CRS mission is the first with the Falcon 9 Block 5. It carried the Global Ecosystem Dynamics Investigation (GEDI) lidar and the Robotic Refueling Mission 3 (RRM3) experiment as external payloads.

Launch 
In February 2016, it was announced that NASA had awarded a contract extension to SpaceX for five additional CRS missions (CRS-16 to CRS-20). In June 2016, a NASA Inspector General report had this mission manifested in August 2018, but it was later delayed to 29 November 2018, 4 December 2018, and 5 December 2018.

The first stage booster B1050.1 experienced a grid fin hydraulic pump stall on re-entry. This caused the first stage to go into a roll after the re-entry burn. It failed to reach Landing Zone 1, but recovered enough to achieve a water landing off Cape Canaveral. Shortly after the landing, Elon Musk, CEO of SpaceX, stated the booster appeared undamaged and was being recovered. After recovering the booster, it was found to be too damaged to fly again and was scrapped for parts.

Payload 
NASA has contracted for the CRS-16 mission from SpaceX and therefore determines the primary payload, date/time of launch, and orbital parameters for the Dragon space capsule. Forty mice also flew with the payload in an experiment called Rodent Research-8 (RR-8).

The CRS-16 mission also carried a pair of CubeSats originally planned to launch aboard the Cygnus NG-10 International Space Station (ISS) cargo resupply mission, but which were deferred. These included the UNITE CubeSat from the University of Southern Indiana and the TechEdSat-8 CubeSat from NASA's Ames Research Center.

The following is a breakdown of cargo bound for the ISS:
 Crew supplies: 
 Science investigations: 
 Rodent Research-8 (RR-8) 
 Molecular Muscle Experiment (MME) 
 Growth of Large, Perfect Protein Crystals for Neutron Crystallography (Perfect Crystals) 
 Spacewalk equipment: 
 Vehicle hardware: 
 Computer resources: 
 Russian hardware: 
 External payloads:
 Global Ecosystem Dynamics Investigation (GEDI): ≈ 
 Robotic Refueling Mission 3 (RRM3)

See also 
 Uncrewed spaceflights to the International Space Station

References

External links 
 Dragon website at SpaceX.com
 Commercial Resupply Services at NASA.gov

SpaceX Dragon
Spacecraft launched in 2018
SpaceX payloads contracted by NASA
Supply vehicles for the International Space Station
Spacecraft which reentered in 2019